The 1939 Tipperary Senior Hurling Championship was the 49th staging of the Tipperary Senior Hurling Championship since its establishment by the Tipperary County Board in 1887.

Thurles Sarsfields were the defending champions.

Thurles Sarsfields won the championship after a 5-03 to 4-02 defeat of Cashel King Cormacs in the final. It was their 12th championship title overall and their second title in succession.

References

Tipperary
Tipperary Senior Hurling Championship